An adaptive system is a set of interacting or interdependent entities, real or abstract, forming an integrated whole that together are able to respond to environmental changes or changes in the interacting parts, in a way analogous to either continuous physiological homeostasis or evolutionary adaptation in biology. Feedback loops represent a key feature of adaptive systems, such as ecosystems and individual organisms; or in the human world, communities, organizations, and families. Adaptive systems can be organized into a hierarchy.

Artificial adaptive systems include robots with control systems that utilize negative feedback to maintain desired states.

The law of adaptation

The law of adaptation may be stated informally as: 

Formally, the law can be defined as follows:

Given a system , we say that a physical event  is a stimulus for the system  if and only if the probability  that the system suffers a change or be perturbed (in its elements or in its processes) when the event  occurs is strictly greater than the prior probability that  suffers a change independently of :

Let  be an arbitrary system subject to changes in time  and let  be an arbitrary event that is a stimulus for the system : we say that  is an adaptive system if and only if when t tends to infinity  the probability that the system  change its behavior  in a time step  given the event  is equal to the probability that the system change its behavior independently of the occurrence of the event . In mathematical terms:

- 
- 

Thus, for each instant  will exist a temporal interval  such that:

Benefit of self-adjusting systems
In an adaptive system, a parameter changes slowly and has no preferred value.  In a self-adjusting system though, the parameter value “depends on the history of the system dynamics”.  One of the most important qualities of self-adjusting systems is its “adaptation to the edge of chaos” or ability to avoid chaos.  Practically speaking, by heading to the edge of chaos without going further, a leader may act spontaneously yet without disaster.  A March/April 2009 Complexity article further explains the self-adjusting systems used and the realistic implications. Physicists have shown that adaptation to the edge of chaos occurs in almost all systems with feedback.

See also

 Autopoiesis
 Adaptive immune system
 Artificial neural network
 Complex adaptive system
 Diffusion of innovations
 Ecosystems
 Gaia hypothesis
 Gene expression programming
 Genetic algorithms
 Learning
 Neural adaptation

Notes

References

External links

Control engineering
Cybernetics
Systems theory